Fabrosaurus is an extinct genus of ornithischian dinosaur that lived during  the Early Jurassic during the Hettangian to Sinemurian stages 199 - 189 mya. It was originally placed within the now obsolete family Fabrosauridae (now considered basal Ornithischia).

Fabrosaurus was named and described by paleontologist Leonard Ginsburg in 1964 based on the holotype specimen, a partial jawbone with three teeth. The name Fabrosaurus means "Fabre's lizard", honoring Jean Fabre, a French geologist and a colleague of Ginsburg on the expedition that collected the fossil in Basutoland (now Lesotho). The type species, F. australis, was named for the location of the fossil in the Elliot Formation, Lesotho, Southern Africa (australis being Latin for "southern"). Fabrosaurus was initially placed within Scelidosauridae by Ginsburg (1964), but later studies have placed it as a basal ornithischian.

Subsequent discoveries included two crushed skulls and disarticulated post-cranial bones (including vertebrae, ribs, and limb bones), allowing for a more complete reconstruction. However, as additional ornithischian fossils were discovered, the features of F. australis were thought to be shared by other species, and by the 1990s and 2000s most authors working with the group found Fabrosaurus to be a nomen dubium (doubtful name), finding the holotype material described by Ginsburg to be insufficient to distinguish a new taxon. Some claim the fossils represent simple variation of Lesothosaurus, which is regarded as a valid taxon.

References

Ornithischian genera
Early Jurassic dinosaurs of Africa
Nomina dubia
Fossil taxa described in 1964
Paleontology in Lesotho